The 2016–17 season is the 106th season in Hajduk Split’s history and their twenty-sixth in the Prva HNL. Their 3rd place finish in the 2015–16 season means it is their 26th successive season playing in the Prva HNL.

First-team squad
For details of former players, see List of HNK Hajduk Split players.

Competitions

Overall record

Prva HNL

Classification

Results summary

Results by round

Results by opponent

Source: 2016–17 Croatian First Football League article

Matches

Friendlies

Pre-season

On-season

Mid-season

Prva HNL

Source: Croatian Football Federation

Croatian Cup

Europa League

Second qualifying round

Third qualifying round

Play-off round 

Source: uefa.com

Player seasonal records
Competitive matches only. Updated to games played 26 May 2017.

Top scorers

Source: Competitive matches

Clean sheets

Source: Competitive matches

Disciplinary record
Includes all competitive matches. Players with 1 card or more included only.

Sources: Prva-HNL.hr, UEFA.com

Appearances and goals

Sources: Prva-HNL.hr, UEFA.com

Overview of statistics

Transfers

In

Total spending:  245.000 €

Out

Total income:  8,2 million €

Total expenditure:  7,955 million €

Promoted from youth squad

Loans in

Loans out

1 Loan was terminated on 13 February 2017

Sources: Glasilo Hrvatskog nogometnog saveza

Notes

References

2016-17
Croatian football clubs 2016–17 season
2016–17 UEFA Europa League participants seasons